Donovan Ryan Cook III (born January 30, 1968) is an American film director, cartoon creator and producer, best known for creating, directing and producing the animated series 2 Stupid Dogs and directing the Disney animated features Return to Never Land and Mickey, Donald, Goofy: The Three Musketeers.

Cook was born in Berkeley, California, in 1968, and moved to San Diego when he was 14. He graduated from the California Institute of the Arts in 1990 and has worked on several different Disney animated movies, such as The Little Mermaid and the Mickey Mouse adaptation of The Prince and the Pauper.

In 1993, he created the Emmy-nominated TV series 2 Stupid Dogs for Hanna-Barbera. The style he revived in 2 Stupid Dogs has been emulated and copied numerous times since. He gained the idea from two stray dogs roaming in his apartment and tried to sell it when Hanna-Barbera bought it. Secret Squirrel was one of his favorite Hanna-Barbera cartoons that he watched in the 1970s, which influenced him to revive the series as Super Secret Secret Squirrel, as the third backup segment in 2 Stupid Dogs.

Cook then returned to Disney in 1997, where he developed and produced the series Nightmare Ned. In 1998, he returned to feature animation when he co-directed Return to Never Land for Disney. In 2001, he took on the challenge of directing the first feature-length film of Mickey Mouse series characters Mickey Mouse and Donald Duck (Goofy had previously appeared in A Goofy Movie and its sequel). The film, Mickey, Donald, Goofy: The Three Musketeers, premiered worldwide on DVD in 2004. He also served as a director for Mickey Mouse Clubhouse and The Adventures of Kid Danger, and was an assistant director for The Ren & Stimpy Show. He even does sheet timing for some episodes of the Ben 10 reboot.

Cook was originally scheduled to co-direct the film Space Chimps, but he would be subsequently scrapped from the project.

His latest project was the low-budget indie film Rideshare: The Movie, the first film ever to be shot on the iPhone 4. It was released on April 12, 2011, on the Buffalo Niagara Film Festival, being subsequently shown on the Honolulu Film Awards. It has won positive reviews.

References

External links
 
 
 Official website of Cook's indie film Rideshare: The Movie

1968 births
Living people
American television directors
American animated film directors
American animated film producers
Animators from California
People from Berkeley, California
American film producers
Television producers from California
American storyboard artists
California Institute of the Arts alumni
Film directors from California
Hanna-Barbera people
American voice directors
Walt Disney Animation Studios people